The Consuelo Formation is a geologic formation in Cuba. It preserves fossils dating back to the Priabonian period. The formation is correlated with the Chapapote Formation of Mexico and the Jackson Formation of the United States.

Description 
The Consuelo Formation was described by Bermúdez in 1950 based on a section of marls in the Consuelo El Tejar quarry in La Habana Province. The formation overlies the Príncipe and Capdevila Formations with an unconformity, and is overlain by the Tinguaro Formation. The Consuelo Formation consists of yellow to creamy-white calcareous marls and white micritic limestones.

Fossil content 
 Cidaris cubensis
 Histocidaris sanchezi

See also 
 List of fossiliferous stratigraphic units in Cuba

References

Bibliography

Further reading 
 
 B. M. Cutress. 1980. Cretaceous and Tertiary Cidaroida (Echinodermata: Echinoidea) of the Caribbean Area. Bulletins of American Paleontology 77(309):1-221

Geologic formations of Cuba
Paleogene Cuba
Marl formations
Limestone formations
Open marine deposits
Formations